This is a list of anime series episodes of the 2007 Japanese animated television series Dōjin Work produced by the Japanese animation studio Remic and directed by Kenichi Yatani. The series began airing on July 4 on a number of Japanese television networks, including but not limited to, Chiba TV and TV Saitama. The anime is based on the manga of the same name written and illustrated by Hiroyuki, centering on a young girl named Najimi Osana who decides to become a dōjin artist so she can make a living producing dōjinshi.

Episode list

References

Dojin Work